Sleeth is an unincorporated community in Carroll County, Indiana, in the United States.

History
W. H. Sleeth was the original owner of the town site. A post office was established at Sleeth in 1880, and remained in operation until it was discontinued in 1907.

References

Unincorporated communities in Carroll County, Indiana
Unincorporated communities in Indiana